Verónica Arbo (born June 4, 1968) is an Argentine sprint canoer. Arbo competed at the 1988 Summer Olympics in Seoul where she was eliminated in the repechages of the K-2 500 m event.

References

1968 births
Argentine female canoeists
Canoeists at the 1988 Summer Olympics
Living people
Olympic canoeists of Argentina
Pan American Games bronze medalists for Argentina
Pan American Games medalists in canoeing
Canoeists at the 1987 Pan American Games
Medalists at the 1987 Pan American Games
20th-century Argentine women